("The Bell") was a purported top-secret Nazi scientific technological device, secret weapon, or . Mainstream reviewers have criticized claims about Die Glocke as being pseudoscientific, recycled rumors, and a hoax.  and other alleged Nazi "miracle weapons" have been dramatized in video games, television shows, and novels.

History 

Cook described Witkowski's claims of a device called "The Bell" engineered by Nazi scientists that was "a glowing, rotating contraption" rumored to have "some kind of antigravitational effect", be a "time machine", or part of an "SS antigravity program" for a flying saucer.

Cook proposed that SS official Hans Kammler later secretly traded this technology to the U.S. military in exchange for his freedom. Fringe theorists have suggested that a concrete ring called "The Henge" near the Wenceslaus mine built in 1943 or 1944 and vaguely resembling Stonehenge was "used as a launch pad for the Bell". According to writer Jason Colavito, the structure is merely the remains of an ordinary industrial cooling tower.

Cook's publication introduced the topic in English without critically discussing the subject. More recently, historian Eric Kurlander has discussed the topic in his 2017 book on Nazi esotericism Hitler's Monsters: A Supernatural History of the Third Reich. According to reviewer Julian Strube, Kurlander "cites from the reservoir of post-war conspiracy theories" and "heavily relies on sensationalist accounts...mixing up contemporary sources with post-war sensationalist literature, half-truths, and fictitious accounts".

According to Salon reviewer Kurt Kleiner, "It's a story that strains credulity. But unless we're after cheap laughs, our hope when we pick up a book like this is that the author will, against the odds, build a careful, reasonable and convincing case. Cook isn't that author". Kleiner criticized Cook's work as "ferreting out minor inconsistencies and odd, ambiguous details which he tries to puff up into proof", characterized the process of evaluating Cook's claims as "untangling science from pseudo-science", and concluded that "what is instructive about the book is the insight we get into how conspiracy theories seduce otherwise reasonable people".

Skeptical author Robert Sheaffer criticized Cook's book as "a classic example of how to spin an exciting yarn based on almost nothing. He visits places where it is rumored that secret UFO and antigravity research is going on...and writes about what he feels and imagines, although he discovers nothing more tangible than unsubstantiated rumors". Sheaffer notes that claims about Die Glocke are circulated by UFOlogists and conspiracy-oriented authors such as Jim Marrs, Joseph P. Farrell, and antigravity proponent John Dering.

Jason Colavito wrote that Witkowski's claims were "recycled" from 1960s rumors of Nazi occult science first published in Morning of the Magicians, and describes Die Glocke as "a device few outside of fringe culture think actually existed. In short, it looks to be a hoax, or at least a wild exaggeration". Author Brian Dunning states that Morning of the Magicians helped promote belief in Die Glocke and Nazi occultism, and its absence in the historical record make it "increasingly unlikely that anything like it actually existed". According to Dunning, "all we have in the way of evidence is a third-hand anecdotal account of something that's desperately implausible, backed up by neither evidence nor even a corroborating account".

Author and historian Robert F. Dorr characterizes Die Glocke as among "the most imaginative of the conspiracy theories" that arose in post-World War II years, and typical of the fantasies of magical German weapons often popularized in pulp magazines such as The Police Gazette.

Some theories circulating on Internet conspiracy sites claim that  is located in a Nazi gold train that is buried in a tunnel beneath a mountain in Poland. Duncan Roads, editor of Nexus magazine, has pointed out that the "Nazis on the Moon trope" is linked to wild speculations about Nazi anti-gravitational technology, such as Witkowski's .

Journalist Patrick J. Kiger wrote that German propaganda of fictional  combined with the secrecy surrounding actual advanced technology such as the V-2 rocket captured at war's end by the U.S. military helped spawn "sensational book-length exposes, web sites, and legions of enthusiasts who revel in rumors of science fiction-like weapons supposedly invented by Hitler’s scientists". According to Kiger,  is a popular example of such legends and speculation, citing former aerospace scientist David Myhra's contention that if antigravity devices actually existed, the Germans, desperate to stop the Allies' advance, would have used them.

See also 

 Kecksburg UFO incident
 Nazism and occultism
 Nazi UFOs
 Project Riese
 Gross-Rosen concentration camp

References

Further reading

External links
 The Nazi Bell - A Detailed Field Investigation to the Flytrap/Henge that Allegedly Held the Bell.
 Die Glocke - Hitler's Anti-Gravity Machine?, by Mark Felton

Anti-gravity
Occultism in Nazism
UFO-related phenomena
Urban legends
Hoaxes in Germany
Paranormal hoaxes